The Nagarathar (also known as Nattukottai Chettiar) is a Tamil caste found native in Tamil Nadu, India. They are a mercantile community who are traditionally involved in commerce, banking and money lending.
They are well known for their temples and the lavish houses they thoughtfully built.

They use the title Chettiar and are traditionally concentrated in modern region Chettinad. They have since the 19th century been prominent entrepreneurs who funded and built several Hindu temples, schools, colleges and universities.

Etymology 
The term Nagarathar literally means "town-dweller". Their title, Chettiar, is a generic term used by several mercantile groups which is derived from the ancient Tamil term etti (bestowed on merchants by the Tamil monarchs).

Nagarathars are also known as Nattukottai Chettiar. The term Nattukottai literally means "country-fort" in reference to their fort-like mansions.

History 
Nattukottai Nagarathars were originally from Naganadu. This ancient land Naganadu is believed to be destroyed (either in an earthquake or floods) and this place was either North or North West of Kanchipuram.

Nagarathars migrated and lived in the following places:

·        Kanchipuram (Thondai Nadu) – From 2897 BC for about 2100 years

·        Kaveripoompatinam (Poompuhar), the capital of the early (Chola Kingdom) – From 789 BC for about 1400 years.

·        Karaikudi (Pandiya Kingdom) – From 707 AD onwards.

When they were in Naganadu these Dhana Vaishyas had three different divisions:

1.   Aaru (Six) Vazhiyar

2.   Ezhu (Seven) Vazhiyar

3.   Nangu (Four) Vazhiyar

All these three divisions were devoted to Emerald Ganesha (மரகத விநாயகர்). Only after they migrated to the Pandya_Kingdom they were called as Ariyurar, Ilayatrangudiyar, and Sundrapattanathar.

Nagarathars of Ilayatrangudiyar were later called as Nattukottai Nagarathar. Ariyurar Nagarathars further split into 3 divisions: Vadakku Valavu, Therku Valavu and Elur Chetty (Nagercoil). Sundrapattanathar Nagarathars migrated to Kollam district in Kerala and their history is completely lost now since there was no record keeping.

The Nagarathar or Nattukkottai Chettiar were originally salt traders and historically an itinerant community of merchants and claim Chettinad as their traditional home. How they reached that place, which at the time comprised adjacent parts of the ancient states of Pudukkottai, Ramnad and Sivagangai, is uncertain, with various communal legends being recorded. There are various claims regarding how they arrived in that area. Among those are a fairly recently recorded claim that they were driven there because of persecution by a Chola king. No more details are forthcoming about this story and as to why the Nagarathar left the Chola kingdom and moved away from Kaveripoompattinam to the Pandiya kingdom.

Another older one, recounted to Edgar Thurston, that they were encouraged to go there by a Pandyan king who wanted to take advantage of their trading skills. The legends converge in saying that they obtained the use of nine temples, with each representing one exogamous part of the community.

The traditional base of the Nattukottai Nagarathars is the Chettinad region of the present-day state of Tamil Nadu. It comprises a triangular area around north-east Sivagangai, north-west Ramnad and south Pudukkottai.

They may have become maritime traders as far back as the 8th century CE. They were trading in salt and by the 17th century, European expansionism in South East Asia during the next century fostered conditions that enabled the community to expand its trading enterprises, including as moneylenders, thereafter. By the late 18th century expanded them to inland and coastal trade in cotton and rice.

In the 19th century, following the Permanent Settlement, some in the Nagarathar community wielded considerable influence in the affairs of the zamindar (landowners) elite. There had traditionally been a relationship between royalty and the community based on the premise that providing worthy service to royalty would result in the granting of high honours but this changed as the landowners increasingly needed to borrow money from the community in order to fight legal battles designed to retain their property and powers. Nagarathars provided that money as mortgaged loans but by the middle of the century they were becoming far less tolerant of any defaults and were insisting that failure to pay as arranged would result in the mortgaged properties being forfeited. By the 19th century were their business activities developed into a sophisticated banking system, with their business expanding to parts of Southeast Asian countries such as Sri Lanka, Myanmar, Malaysia, Singapore, Indonesia and China.

Varna Classification

In the absence of a proper chaturvarna system in South India, Naattukottai Nagarathars were classified as high ranking Shudras and sometimes as Vaishyas (Vyshya).

Religious influence
The nine temples connected with the Nagarathar community include: Ilayathakudi, Iluppaikkudi, Iraniyur, Mathur, Nemam, Pillayarpatti, Soorakudi, Vairavanpatti, and Velangudi.

Cuisine

Famous personalities 

Pattinathar, a philosopher and ascetic who belonged to the 10th or 14th century CE.
Karaikkal Ammaiyar, a Saivite saint and one of the 63 Nayanmars.
Raja 'Sir' Annamalai Chettiar, Raja of Chettinad
P Chidambaram, Indian politician and Member of Parliament.
Alagappa Chettiar, businessman and philanthropist.
A. C. Muthiah, Indian industrialist.
Kavingar Kannadasan, Famous poet and Cinema Lyricist
Raj Chetty, American Economist

See also 
Chettiar
Sri Lankan Chetties

References

Resources
 Rajeswary Brown. (1993). Chettiar capital and Southeast Asian credit networks in the inter-war period. In G. Austin and K. Sugihara, eds. Local Suppliers of Credit in the Third World, 1750-1960. New York: St. Martin's Press.
 David Rudner. (1989). "Banker's Trust and the culture of banking among the Nattukottai Chettiars of colonial South India". Modern Asian Studies 23(3), 417–458.
 
 Heiko Schrader. (1996). "Chettiar finance in Colonial Asia". Zeitschrift fur Ethnologie 121, 101–126.
 

Chettiar
Social groups of Tamil Nadu
Indian castes